Green Star Express Inc. is a provincial bus company plying in Laguna, Philippines. Previously known as Laguna Transportation Company Inc. before it changed into its new name, this company plies routes from Calamba, Laguna to Manila and vice versa. This bus company, before the JAC Liner Inc. acquisition, is a sister of HM Transport Inc., a Mercado-affiliated bus company. Currently, it is now a sister company of Lucena Lines Inc. and JAC Liner, Inc.

History

Green Star Express Inc., was formally organized as a corporation sometime in 2001 with a primary purpose of transporting passengers or as common carrier. Since then its buses are seen plying the highways to and from Santa Cruz, Laguna, and Manila. This corporation is being managed by the Mercado Family of San Pedro, Laguna, a well-known transportation magnate in Southern Luzon for decades.

Transportation business of this Mercado family formally started by the late Artemio Mercado in April 1968 doing business under the name and style of JAM Transit, Inc. Soon thereafter, the family was able to expand their operations and eventually organized or acquired other bus companies plying the major routes of Laguna, Quezon and Bicol region with commanding superiority. These bus companies include, Jam Liner Inc., Pacita Liner, Inc. (now sister company), Quezon Liner, Inc. (now travel), AMA Transport Services (now called Amihan Bus Lines), and Laguna Transportation Co., Inc. (now called Laguna Express Inc.), among others.

The onset of the Asian financial crisis in 1997 did not spare the family of its accompanying disastrous effects of the transport business. After careful study and evaluation, the board decided that temporary downsizing of the family’s business operation is the most appropriate strategic move which resulted in the divestment of the Jam Transit, Inc., Jam Liner, Inc., and AMA Transport Services.

In the year 2001 after the divestments, in recognition of the need to modernize the business by adding a new fleet to satisfy the discriminating quest of the riding public for safe and comfortable travel, Green Star Express, Inc. was formed.

Today, Green Star Express, Inc. is continuously plying its route in observance and obedience to its Franchise issued by the Land Transportation Franchising and Regulatory Board (LTFRB). The commitment of the corporation in its modernization efforts is not only real but apparent. It accepted the further challenge by expressing its full commitment to the use of CNG fuelled Passenger Buses the government is spearheading. It is among the pioneer applicant of the DOE program, the Natural Gas Vehicle Program for Public Transport (NGVPPT). The company has already made contract to the CNG manufacturers for the order of CNG Buses to be deployed in its Laguna-Manila operations.

Recently, JAC Liner Inc. took over the Santa Cruz line of Green Star and bought its Yutong fleet. The same month, it put out its 51-series Yutong buses formerly owned by Lucena Lines and gave a new paint job to the 13-series buses bought during the Mercado era.

Green Star Express has adopted a CNG bus (compressed natural gas-made bus). Its sister company, HM Transport Inc., was the first company to adopt the CNG gas, followed by Batangas Star Express Corp./Batman Star Express Corp./KL CNG Bus Transport Corp., another sister company, RRCG Transport, and the latest was Biñan Bus Line Transport System, Inc. or more commonly known as BBL Trans, of which their UD Nissan Diesel and Daewoo units were used for city operation from Balibago Complex, Santa Rosa, Laguna to SM Fairview in Quezon City. Recently, it has given a new paint job to its 2003 numbered Nissan Diesel. bus units.

Recent updates

Unlike other bus companies under the Mercado Group, Green Star Express Inc. has not been involved yet in road accidents. Since its establishment in 2001, it has continued to improve its transportation services. Several years since its establishment, it opened a new terminal at Ayala in Makati.

In 2004, the bus was used in the U.S. reality show Amazing Race Season 5 when contestants were not able to find a taxi cab in the middle of the highway in Victoria, Laguna.

On February 13, 2010, Green Star Express and Biñan Bus Line Transport System Inc. (BBL Trans) signed an agreement in regards to the so-called "integrated inspection", but this is only applied to Pacita-Lawton route. In this agreement, ticket inspectors from GSEI will be assigned to inspect the BBL Trans buses, and also the ticket inspectors from BBL Trans will be assigned to GSEI, where they will be able to inspect tickets to the passengers to check out who among them is not a senior citizen or student.

In 2011, Dimple Star Transport (owned by Napat family) acquired another fleet of KingLong XMQ6119T as part of the partnership with Green Star Express, Inc. (owned by Mercado family) for Alabang-Lawton route.

In 2017, Lucena Lines acquired Santa Cruz Line.

Currently Green Star Express is under Lucena Lines. (Provincial operation) South City Express inc. (In city operation)

Fleet

In March 2014, after the JAC Liner acquisition, it put out its 51-series Yutong buses and recently, the 59-series buses was put to operation through its subsidiary.

Destinations

Metro Manila
 Buendia, Pasay
 Starmall Alabang, Muntinlupa
Provincial Destinations
 Calamba, Laguna
 Santa Cruz, Laguna

Former Destinations

with the under management of Green Star Express Inc, used to had this routes. which is now acquired by HM Transport.

 Park n' Ride, Plaza Lawton, Manila
 Pacita Complex, San Pedro, Laguna

Under Lucena Lines
With the under management of Lucena Lines took the Santa Cruz Line from management of Green Star Express.

 Santa Cruz, Laguna
 Lipa, Batangas

See also
HM Transport Inc.
JAC Liner Inc.
JAM Liner
 List of bus companies of the Philippines

Bus companies of the Philippines
Companies based in Laguna (province)